Skandavarodaya College (Skantha Varodaya College) is a provincial school in Kandarodai, Jaffna District, Sri Lanka.

See also
 List of schools in Northern Province, Sri Lanka
 Kantharodai Tamil Kandaiya Vidyasalai

References

External links
 Skandavarodaya College (Official website)
 Old Students Association - Canada

Provincial schools in Sri Lanka
Schools in Jaffna District